Frederic Sterling Lee (November 24, 1949 – October 23, 2014) was an American heterodox economist. His primary theoretical contribution to heterodox economics lies in the areas of pricing, price, production, costs, market competition, market governance, and the modeling the economy as a disaggregated, emergent whole. He was the founding editor of the Heterodox Economics Newsletter (2004–09), the editor of the American Journal of Economics and Sociology (2009–13), the president of the Association for Institutional Thought (2012), the president of the Association for Evolutionary Economics (2015), and the founder and honorary life president of the Association for Heterodox Economics. Lee authored and edited seventeen books, including Post Keynesian Price Theory (1998), A History of Heterodox Economics (2009), and Microeconomic Theory: A Heterodox Approach (2017). He published fifty-six articles and over a hundred book chapters, book entries, book reviews, and notes of one sort or another.

Biography

Lee was born in 1949 in Nyack, New York, and grew up in Virginia. His father, Sterling Lee, was a labor lawyer and his mother, Marian Burks Lee, was a politically active person. With this family background he was aware of progressive politics and civil and workers rights even in his early days. He went to Frostburg State College (Maryland, 1968–1972) and obtained a BA degree in history. While doing his undergraduate study, he was interested in philosophy and later in economics because he found that social questions in the 19th century were mainly examined by economists. After two years of working in Saudi Arabia (a supply clerk position with the Corps of Engineers in Riyadh), he returned to the United States and continued his study at Columbia University in New York City. In 1977 Fred Lee met Alfred S. Eichner who later became his “mentor, dissertation advisor, and friend.” He once noted that the “discovery of Eichner” was “the most important in my academic career.” With Eichner's encouragement and support, Fred Lee started his PhD study in economics at Rutgers University in 1978, where he was taught by Alfred Eichner, Paul Davidson, Jan Kregel, Nina Shapiro, and Alessandro Roncaglia, among others. After graduating from Rutgers University in 1983, he taught at University of California—Riverside (1981-1984), Roosevelt University (Chicago, 1984–1990), Staffordshire Polytechnic (Stoke-on-Trent, UK, 1990–1991), De Montfort University (Leicester, UK, 1991–2000), and the University of Missouri—Kansas City (2000–2014).

Selected publications

Books 
 Microeconomic Theory: A Heterodox Approach, authored by Frederic S. Lee, edited by Tae-Hee Jo, London: Routledge. 2018  
 Handbook of Research Methods and Applications in Heterodox Economics, edited with Bruce Cronin, Edward Elgar. 2016.  
 Marx, Veblen, and the Foundations of Heterodox Economics: Essays in Honor of John F. Henry, edited with Tae-Hee Jo, London: Routledge. 2015  
 Social Costs of Markets and Economic Theory (edited), Wiley-Blackwell, 2014.  
 Markets, Competition, and the Economy as a Social System (edited), Wiley-Blackwell, 2013 
 In Defense of Post-Keynesian and Heterodox Economics:  Responses to their critics (edited with Marc Lavoie), Routledge, 2012.  
 Social Provisioning, Embeddedness and Modeling the Economy (edited), Wiley-Blackwell, 2011. 
 Social, Methods, and Microeconomics:  Contributions to doing economics better (edited), Wiley-Blackwell, 2011. 
 Evaluating Economic Research in a Contested Discipline:  Ranking, pluralism, and the future of heterodox economics (edited with W. Elsner), Wiley-Blackwell, 2010. 
 A History of Heterodox Economics:  Challenging the mainstream in the twentieth century, Routledge,  2009.  
 Radical Economics and Labor: Essays Inspired by the IWW Centennial (edited with Jon Bekken), Routledge,  2009.  
 Post Keynesian Price Theory, Cambridge University Press, 1998. Reprinted in paperback, November, 2006.  
 A Monetary Theory of Employment by Gardiner C. Means (edited with Warren Samuels), M. E. Sharpe, 1994. 
 Oxford Economics and Oxford Economists 1922–1971:  Recollections of Students and Economists (edited), Bodleian Library, Oxford, 1993, (MS. Eng. c. 4819).  
 The Economics of P. W. S. Andrews:  A Collection (edited with Peter E. Earl), Edward Elgar, 1993.  
 Oxford Economics and Oxford Economists (co‑authored with Warren Young), Macmillan, 1993.  
 The Heterodox Economics of Gardiner C. Means:  A Collection (edited with Warren J. Samuels), M. E. Sharpe, 1992.

References

External links
 Frederic S. Lee's website
 Tributes in Memory of Frederic S. Lee
 Frederic S. Lee Heterodox Economics Scholarship Fund
 Fred Lee's Keynote Speech at the Association for Heterodox Economics 2014 Conference , University of Greenwich, UK. July 2014. 
 Fred Lee's presentation at the International Post Keynesian Conference , Kansas City, USA. September 2014.
 Fred Lee's last lecture at the University of Missouri-Kansas City, April 24, 2014. 
 Heterodox Economics Newsletter
 Heterodox Economics Directory

1949 births
2014 deaths
American economists
Post-Keynesian economists